Theodore Porter "Tad" Friend (born September 25, 1962) is a staff writer for The New Yorker who writes the magazine's "Letter from California".

Life
Born in Buffalo, New York, Friend was raised there and in Swarthmore, Pennsylvania,  where his father, Theodore Friend, was president of Swarthmore College. He was educated at The Shipley School and Harvard University.

Friend was a contributing editor at various publications, including Esquire, prior to becoming a staff writer at The New Yorker in 1998. His work there includes the magazine's "Letter from California". In 2001, he published "Lost in Mongolia: Travels in Hollywood and Other Foreign Lands", a collection of his articles.  His memoir,  Cheerful Money: Me, My Family, and the Last Days of Wasp Splendor, was published in 2009.

Friend is married to food writer Amanda Hesser, with whom he has twin children. He lives in Brooklyn Heights.

Bibliography

Books

Interviews

Notes

External links
 Column archive | The New Yorker

1962 births
Living people
20th-century American writers
21st-century American non-fiction writers
American male journalists
Harvard University alumni
Writers from Buffalo, New York
The New Yorker staff writers
Journalists from New York (state)
20th-century American journalists
20th-century American male writers
People from Brooklyn Heights
People from Delaware County, Pennsylvania
Shipley School alumni
21st-century American male writers